The Call of Duty Championship is an annual Call of Duty tournament held at the end of each competitive season to determine the year's World Champion. To determine qualification, teams must qualify through events before the World Championship. Players must be at least 18 years of age as of the beginning of the tournament in order to participate.

History 
The inaugural tournament was first held in 2013 on Call of Duty: Black Ops II for the Xbox 360 and was won by Fariko Impact. In 2014, playing Call of Duty: Ghosts, Complexity Gaming won the $400,000 championship prize.

The 2015 iteration of the event was won by Denial eSports with team consisting of Chris "Replays" Crowder, Dillon "Attach" Price, James "Clayster" Eubanks, and Jordan "JKap" Kaplan.

The 2016 iteration occurred 2–4 September 2016, unlike previous ones held in the spring, with a two million dollar prize pool. It was announced on June 8, 2016, that the championship will take place along with Call of Duty XP which will reveal the Infinite Warfare Multiplayer Trailer.  Team EnvyUs won the event, with a line-up of JKap, SlasheR, Apathy, and John (who was named MVP of the event).

In 2020, Activision and Sony Mobile announced the inaugural Call of Duty: Mobile Championship would begin on April 30. However, in December, Activision canceled the Mobile Grand Finals due to the COVID-19 pandemic, and distributed the $750,000 prize pool between the seven teams who qualified for the Finals.

The 2021 Call of Duty League season began January 23, 2021. In April 2021, Activision announced the 2021 Call of Duty: Mobile Championship would begin on June 3.

Championship breakdown

References 

 
Recurring events established in 2013
Sports competitions in Los Angeles